This is a comparison of chipsets, manufactured by ATI Technologies.

For AMD processors

Comparison of Northbridges

Comparison of Southbridges

For Intel processors

Comparison of Northbridges

Comparison of Southbridges

See also
 List of Intel chipsets
 Comparison of AMD chipsets
 Comparison of Nvidia chipsets
 List of VIA chipsets
 Comparison of AMD graphics processing units
 Comparison of Nvidia graphics processing units

External links
 Intel chipset solutions
 AMD chipset solutions

ATI Chipsets
ATI Chipsets